Richard Lee Rudd (born September 12, 1956), nicknamed "The Rooster", is an American former racing driver. He is the uncle of actor Skeet Ulrich and former NASCAR Busch Series driver Jason Rudd. He retired in 2007 with 23 career wins. He was named the 2006 Virginian of the Year and was inducted into the Virginia Sports Hall of Fame in 2007. In October 2010, he was selected to the Hampton Roads Sports Hall of Fame, which honors those who have contributed to sports in southeastern Virginia.

Career

Early life
Rudd was born in South Norfolk, Virginia (now Chesapeake), the son of Margaret (née McMannen) and Alvin R. Rudd Sr., the president of Al Rudd Auto Parts. He began racing as a teenager in karting and motocross, but did not attempt stock car racing until he was eighteen years old, when he made his NASCAR debut at North Carolina Speedway in 1975, driving the No. 10 Ford for family friend Bill Champion.

Qualifying 26th, he finished in 11th place despite running 46 laps down. He ran an additional three races for Champion, his best finish being a tenth at Bristol Motor Speedway. He drove another four races in 1976 for his father, posting another tenth finish at the Firecracker 400. He went full-time in 1977, again driving the No. 22 for his father. He had ten Top 10 finishes and was named Rookie of the Year. Rudd ran part-time the following season. Despite the abbreviated schedule, he earned four top-tens and finished 31st in points. In 1979, he signed with Junie Donlavey to pilot the No. 90 Truxmore-sponsored car, garnering four Top 5’s and a ninth-place finish in the final points standings.

He did not return to Donlavey in 1980, and started out in a part-time run for his dad and D. K. Ulrich. He would end the season in the No. 7 Sanyo-sponsored car for Nelson Malloch, for whom he had one tenth-place run.

1981–1987

In 1981, Rudd signed with DiGard Motorsports to drive the No. 88 car. Although he had no victories, he won his first three pole positions, and began his lengthy streak of consecutive race starts. In 1982 Rudd stepped into the No. 3 Pontiac for Richard Childress Racing. Rudd had six Top 5s but dropped down to ninth in the points standings. He was able to get his first two career wins in 1983 at Riverside and Martinsville respectively, but he again finished ninth in points. He also ran the only three Busch Series races of his career that season, winning in his debut event at Dover Downs.

In 1984, Rudd and Dale Earnhardt swapped rides, with Rudd moving over to the No. 15 Ford for Bud Moore. The move came after Earnhardt signed with Childress, leaving Rudd disappointed and out of a ride until he drove for Moore. Rudd was involved in a horrific crash in the Busch Clash at Daytona, in which his car went airborne (in a crash that Ned Jarrett described as something like a "bucking horse") before suffering a concussion and a torn cartilage in his rib cage. His eyes were swollen so badly he taped his eyes open to be able to race in the Daytona 500, as well as a flak jacket for his rib injury. After learning of this long after the fact, NASCAR instituted the policy of examining all drivers involved in wrecks to ensure that they will be able to race safely the next week. He won his first race for this team in only his second start at Richmond and improved to seventh in points. He moved up one spot in points in the following season, and then a career-best 5th-place finish in 1986. Despite an additional 2 victories in 1987, Rudd left Moore Engineering at the end of the season.

1988–1993

Rudd joined King Racing beginning in 1988 in the No. 26 Buick Regal owned by drag racing legend Kenny Bernstein. He struggled with engine failures all season long and finished 11th in the point standings, his worst points finish in eight years. In addition, Rudd suffered a knee injury in a crash at The Winston. At North Wilkesboro, Rudd was fined $10,000 for actions detrimental to stock car racing after spinning Dale Earnhardt late in the race. After his only win of 1989, which came at the inaugural Sears Point event, Rudd departed the operation. He tangled with Earnhardt again at North Wilkesboro, as a last-lap altercation while fighting for the lead handed the win to Geoff Bodine. In 1990, Rudd signed with Hendrick Motorsports to drive the No. 5 Chevrolet Lumina. He was able to win The Bud at the Glen and finished seventh in the point standings. However, he was involved in a fatal pit road accident in the season-finale Atlanta Journal 500, in which he spun into Bill Elliott's pit and accidentally crushed Elliott's tire changer Mike Rich, who died hours later in surgery. That fatal incident caused NASCAR to implement pit road speed limits at every NASCAR track, for all of the series.

In 1991, Rudd won his only race of the year at Darlington Raceway. Later in the year at Sonoma, Rudd was the center of controversy in one of the most bizarre finishes in NASCAR. Rudd started on pole at the race, and was offered a bonus paycheck with the winning money if he won the race. Rudd drove up to second spot with 3 laps left, and when the white flag was waved Rudd tapped Davey Allison to take the lead. When Rudd came back around to the finish line he waved to his pit crew but was shown a black flag for the tap. His win was taken away and given to Allison who refired to end up in second place. Rudd ended up in second place; Rick Hendrick, and crew chief Waddell Wilson unsuccessfully tried to appeal the penalties.

He finished the year a career-best 2nd-place finish in points. The following season, he won the Peak Antifreeze 500, but dropped to seventh in points. After finishing another three spots lower in points in 1993, he left Hendrick to start his own racing corporation Rudd Performance Motorsports.

1994–1999

Rudd took Tide and formed his own race team in 1994, Rudd Performance Motorsports and drove the No. 10 Ford Thunderbird that season. His first win as an owner/driver came at New Hampshire International Speedway, which led to a fifth-place points finish. 1995 saw his consecutive winning streak almost end before he won the Dura Lube 500 at Phoenix, the second-to-last race of the season. He had another near miss in 1996, but won at North Carolina Speedway.

In 1997, Rudd had two wins, one in the Brickyard 400 and the other at Dover International Speedway, making this his highest win total since 1987, but he dropped to 17th in the points standings, making this the first time he finished outside of the Top 10 in nine years. His only win in 1998 came at Martinsville Speedway, dealing with high air temperatures and a faulty cooling system. As a result, Rudd suffered burns and blisters over most of his body, and gave his victory lane interview lying on the ground breathing from an oxygen mask. This would be the last win of his consecutive victory streak, as he struggled with mechanical failures and wrecks throughout the season. The following year, Rudd failed to win a race, snapping a 16-season streak with at least one victory. When Tide left his team, Rudd chose to liquidate his equipment and close his team.

2000–2005
After many rumors and speculation, Rudd was hired to pilot the No. 28 Texaco/Havoline-sponsored Ford Taurus for Robert Yates Racing in 2000. Although he still did not win any races that season, he did have two poles and moved to fifth in the points standings, a 26-spot improvement over the previous season. In 2001, Rudd got his first win in three years at Pocono, followed by another win at Richmond late in the season. He also matched a career-high 14 top-five finishes. Rudd scored his final win at Sonoma in 2002, but dropped to 10th in points. Following the fall Richmond race, Rudd had a heated argument with RYR engine specialist Larry Lackey on pit road, with Lackey punching Rudd in the face and Rudd retaliating with a water bottle. Rudd was fined 5,000 and placed on probation while Lackey was fined 10,000 before resigning from his position at RYR. Rudd left RYR at the end of the 2002 season.

In 2003, Rudd signed to drive the No. 21 Ford for Wood Brothers Racing, replacing Elliott Sadler, who took over Rudd's seat at RYR. Rudd scored four top-fives and a 23rd-place finish in points that year. The following year, he won his final career pole at Talladega, but fell a spot in the standings. He was able to recover to earn nine top 10s in 2005 and improved to 21st in points. The closest he came to winning a race between 2003 and 2005 was at Sonoma in 2005, when he led several laps and finished second to Tony Stewart after being passed by him with nine laps to go.

At the end of the 2005 season, Rudd left the No. 21 team and announced he would "take a break from racing", although he would not effectively retire. At the time he was known as NASCAR's "ironman", or record holder for most consecutive starts, ending at 788, and holding the record until it was surpassed by Jeff Gordon in 2015.

2006–2007

Rudd spent most of 2006 out of racing, racing only at Dover, where he filled in for an ailing Tony Stewart. He made an appearance to meet and sign autographs for fans at the 2006 Carl Casper's Custom Auto Show at Freedom Hall in Louisville, Kentucky and meanwhile, he also raced in a karting event called the RoboPong 200 in Newcastle, Indiana in a race full of IndyCar stars, and eventually etching his name on the Dan Wheldon Cup, the trophy that since 2012 has become that event's signature trophy. Late in the season, it was announced he would return to Yates to drive the No. 88 Ford full-time. His best finish since his return to the sport was seventh in the Coca-Cola 600. Since he missed the Chevy Rock & Roll 400, it was the first time in his career where he did not make a start due to an injury. Kenny Wallace drove the No. 88 on an interim basis until Rudd healed, except at Talladega, where Mike Wallace drove the car. Rudd made his return at Charlotte, where he finished 11th. He finished his career with a 21st-place finish at the Ford 400 at Homestead-Miami.

After racing
After the 2007 season, and a 32-year career, Rudd resides at his home in Cornelius, North Carolina. In 2007, Rudd was inducted into the 2007 Virginia Sports Hall of Fame and in 2010, he was selected to the Hampton Roads Sports Hall of Fame that honors those who have contributed to sports in southeastern Virginia. Rudd now lives what he calls "a very simple lifestyle" with his family. On February 7, 2012, Rudd signed to be an analyst for Speed Channel's  weekend motor sports news program, SPEED Center. Following the announcement he said, "I'm really looking forward to the next chapter. It’s going to be a lot of fun working with the gang at SPEED." In 2013, Rudd made appearances in Series Two of the TV show Dallas in scenes filmed at Texas Motor Speedway as the hired driver for Christopher Ewing's methane-powered race car.

On February 17, 2014, Rudd was inducted into the Daytona Beach Stock car Hall of Fame by Rotary International.

Even though he retired from professional racing, Rudd still races go-karts at GoPro Motorplex in the Charlotte area.

Motorsports career results

NASCAR
(key) (Bold – Pole position awarded by qualifying time. Italics – Pole position earned by points standings or practice time. * – Most laps led.)

Nextel Cup Series

Daytona 500

Late Model Sportsman Series

International Race of Champions
(key) (Bold – Pole position. * – Most laps led.)

References

Driver Spotlight

External links

Living people
1956 births
Sportspeople from Chesapeake, Virginia
Racing drivers from Virginia
NASCAR drivers
International Race of Champions drivers
NASCAR team owners
International Kart Federation drivers
People from Cornelius, North Carolina
Richard Childress Racing drivers
Hendrick Motorsports drivers
Robert Yates Racing drivers